Acromyrmex niger is a species of New World ants of the subfamily Myrmicinae of the genus Acromyrmex.  It is found in the wild naturally in southern Brazil and Paraguay.

Synonyms 
 Acromyrmex depressoculis Gonçalves, 1967
 Acromyrmex homalops Gonçalves, 1967
 Acromyrmex muticinoda Gonçalves, 1967
 Oecodoma nigra F. Smith 1858

External links

Acromyrmex
Insects described in 1858
Hymenoptera of South America